Tegem, also Jebel Tekeim, is a Niger–Congo language spoken in Kordofan, Sudan. It is sometimes considered a dialect of Lafofa, which is poorly attested.

Phonology

Consonants 

 Labialization [ʷ] is also said to occur among sounds.
 The following sounds can occur as geminated, [bː, mː, t̪ː, d̪ː, rː, lː, ɫː, ʈː, cː, ɟː, kː].

Vowels 

 Vowel length is also distinctive.

References

Sources
Roger Blench, 2011 (ms), "Does Kordofanian constitute a group and if not, where does its languages fit into Niger-Congo?"

Lafofa languages